Armed to the Teeth is Swollen Members' fifth full-length release, released on October 27, 2009. It is their first release in three years, as the group had taken a break over the past few years while member Madchild dealt with drug addiction and legal issues. The album features guest appearances by Talib Kweli and Tech N9ne. In the United States the album debuted at #146 on the Billboard 200 with 3,400 copies sold in its first week, making it their first appearance on that chart.

On August 25, 2009, the first single, "Warrior" (featuring Tre Nyce and Young Kazh) was released and peaked at #94 on the Canadian Hot 100. The second single, "Red Dragon", a remix of the track of the same name, performed and produced by former Swollen Members member Moka Only on the album Monsters in the Closet was released on September 8. Three days later, a music video for the lead single "Warrior" was released. On October 19, the full album became listenable on Swollen Members' MySpace page. The third single "Bollywood Chick" (featuring Tech N9ne & Tre Nyce) was released around October and the music video was released on November 10 via Swollen Members' YouTube account. The fourth single "Porn Star" (featuring Tre Nyce) was released in early 2010 and music video was released on YouTube via Swollen Members' YouTube account.

Track listing

Charts

References 

2009 albums
Swollen Members albums
Suburban Noize Records albums